The Bradley BA-300 Himat was a proposed American canard homebuilt aircraft from Bradley Aerospace, introduced in the mid-1990s. The aircraft was to have been supplied as a kit for amateur construction, but it does not seem to have progressed to the prototype stage.

Design and development
The BA-300 Himat was to have featured a canard layout, with three seats in an enclosed cabin and pusher configuration.

The belly tank was to have also been convertible for other uses, including plans for drop-doors.

Operational history
In April 2015 no examples were registered in the United States with the Federal Aviation Administration.

Specifications (BA-300 Himat)

References

BA-300
1990s United States civil utility aircraft
Single-engined pusher aircraft
Canard aircraft
Homebuilt aircraft